Hakan Gökçek (born 26 March 1993) is an Austrian footballer who plays as a winger for Austrian Regionalliga club TWL Elektra.

References

External links

1993 births
Living people
Association football forwards
Austrian footballers
2. Liga (Austria) players
Austrian Regionalliga players
TFF Second League players
First Vienna FC players
Tarsus Idman Yurdu footballers
FC Liefering players
Tuzlaspor players
1. Wiener Neustädter SC players